Rugby union in the Netherlands is a growing sport. The sport is governed by the Rugby Nederland, which organizes the Netherlands national rugby union team.

Governing body

The Rugby Nederland was founded on 7 September 1920 but ceased to exist in 1923 due to a lack of clubs. They reorganized on 1 October 1932, as Dutch Rugby Union (Dutch: "Nederlandse Rugby Bond"), two years after the Netherlands national rugby union team played their first match against Belgium. The union is affiliated to the  IRB in 1988  and has 15,000 registered players (in 2017).

History

The first rugby club was HFC, established on 15 September 1879 by the 14-year-old Pim Mulier, who first encountered the sport in 1870. However, HFC switched to association football in 1883. The Delftsche Studenten Rugby - Club (DSR-C) was the first official rugby club on 24 September 1918.

Dutch rugby started setting down roots in the pre-World War II period. The subsequent German occupation and World War II disrupted its growth, and it took years for the Dutch game to return to its pre-war state. Then in the post-war years, the massive growth and stifling influence of Dutch association football on other sports also hindered further development.

The first Dutch international was in 1932, against Belgium.

Nonetheless, the Netherlands' proximity to the European rugby heartland of the British Isles and France, has ensured a fairly healthy stream of touring sides
from these areas. Given the low profile of the game in the Netherlands, Dutch rugby still manages to support over a hundred clubs, and has 7–8,000 players, which is a larger number than some Rugby World Cup entrants.

Women's rugby in the Netherlands started at Rugbyclub Wageningen in 1975. At their first 5-year anniversary the Wageningen rugby men organized a rugby match for the girlfriends against the girlfriends of the befriended Eindhoven Students rugby team The Elephants. The Wageningen women won this game with 4-0 and the seed for Dutch women rugby was planted. It took until 1981 when the first official women rugby competition round was played.

In the 1978–79 season, the Dutch leagues were affected by a severe winter, which prevented teams from playing on grass rugby pitches.  The season managed to finish on time, mainly because the matches were transferred onto beaches to avoid snow and ice.

Dutch rugby received a boost in 1996 when they beat a full-strength team from Moseley RFC.

Notable Dutch players
 Michiel van der Loos, a lock from the Hague. Van der Loos played successfully in Wales and France and was twice asked to consider naturalization in order to play for one of their national sides.
 Marcel Bierman, a fly half. Tragically, Bierman broke his neck in the 1988 Hong Kong Sevens, and this gave the sport a bad image in the Netherlands at the time.
 Yves Kummer
 Paul Bloom, winger.
 Visser family.
Tim Visser, player for Dutch club RC Hilversum, Newcastle Falcons and Edinburgh Rugby, and Scotland international.
 Marc Visser, father of Tim, no. 8 and most capped player for the Netherlands.
 Sep Visser, younger brother of Tim, RC Hilversum and Edinburgh Rugby, and Dutch international.
 Marcker brothers
 Andre Marcker 
 Hans Marcker
 Mats Marcker.
 Peter Marcker
Zeno Kieft, back rower of La Rochelle, in the French Top 14. 
Women
 Kelly van Harskamp - Female rugby sevens player who was the IRB Sevens Women's Player of the Year in 2010-11

See also

 Netherlands national rugby union team
 Netherlands women's national rugby union team
 Netherlands national rugby sevens team
 Netherlands women's national rugby sevens team
 RC 't Gooi

References

 Cotton, Fran (Ed.) (1984) The Book of Rugby Disasters & Bizarre Records. Compiled by Chris Rhys. London. Century Publishing. 
 McLaren, Bill A Visit to Hong Kong in Starmer-Smith, Nigel & Robertson, Ian (eds) The Whitbread Rugby World '90 (Lennard Books, 1989)
 Richards, Huw A Game for Hooligans: The History of Rugby Union (Mainstream Publishing, Edinburgh, 2007)

External links
Netherlands IRB page
 Rugby Nederland official website
 Dutch gem Tim starts to shine
 Dutch rugby news
 Dutch Rugby Group
 Haagsche Rugby Club (HRC)
 Amstelveense Rugby Club
 Rugbyclub Wageningen
 Netherlands Rugby news
 Archives du Rugby: Pays Bas